"Everything Reminds Me of You" is a pop, Soul ballad by the Commodores, released in 1993 and Covered by the Jamaican recording artist Tessanne Chin, which she released as the second single from her major label debut album Count on My Love. It is written by Rock City aka Planet VI and co-written by Tessanne while produced by Grammy Award-winning producer Supa Dups. Although it is the second single from the album behind "Tumbling Down", it serves as the album's lead single.

Promotion
The song was debuted during the Season 6 semifinal round of The Voice with a live performance.

Release history

References

2014 singles
Republic Records singles
2014 songs
Songs written by Theron Thomas
Songs written by Timothy Thomas